Center for the Intellectual Development of Child and Adolescent (CIDCA, Kānoon-e Parvaresh-e Fekri-e Koodakān va Nojavānān,  better known as Kanoon or Kānoon) is an Iranian institution with a wide range of cultural and artistic activities in the field of mental and cultural development for children and young adults. The organization was at the center of the vanguard of cultural production in the late 60s and early 1970s and is the platform through which many of Iran's most regarded artists and filmmakers, such as Abbas Kiarostami and Morteza Momayez and Babak Niktalab, launched their careers.

History

Early years
Founded in 1965, Kanoon was originally one of the many cultural initiatives that fell under the broad purview of Farah Diba. Its initial ambitions were educational and social in nature; the program, led by one of Farah's close friends Lili Amir-Arjomand, involved building a network of both permanent and traveling libraries across the country in order to promote culture and literacy. During this period, Kanoon's publishing consisted only of translating and importing western classics such as Hans Christian Andersen. Eventually, Kanoon began producing and publishing its own books and soon after grew to be not just a social organization, but also a prolific producer of many kinds of materials for children.

At the center of this leg of the initiative was Firooz Shirvanloo, who acted as both co-director and as an informal Art Director for the organization. Through Shirvanloo, Kanoon attracted many of the famous names that are associated with the project today: Abbas Kiarostami, Farshid Mesghali, Noureddin Zarrinkelk, Amir Naderi, Morteza Momayez, Ali Akbar Sadeghi, and more. Shirvanloo's strong political leanings also attracted an equally significant group of left-wing writers and researchers. (He was fired in 1972 for this very reason.)

Eventually the book publishing and illustration segued into animation which then segued into film, which required posters and pretty soon Kanoon was producing everything from toys designed by sculptors, to staging theatrical productions, printing LPs of Iranian music, LPs of Western Classical music, LPs of poetry, festivals, and conferences. Many these materials toured with the traveling libraries.

Within the walls of Kanoon, there was an unprecedented amount of freedom and support provided to the artists involved. Under these circumstances Kanoon turned into a sort of quasi-utopian hub, or incubator or laboratory for an incredible group of artists, many of whom worked across several media (most of the major protagonists were designers and also illustrators and would experiment with animation or filmmaking if they chose to). To have this type venue available at this pivotal moment when Iran is transitioning into modernity in terms of its visual culture was absolutely crucial. The output of Kanoon during this era more or less defined the aura of childhood in Iran for an entire generation. These were the books that everybody read, the music that everyone heard and this legacy is still quite potent today.

This incorporation of folk elements was critical to Kanoon's signature style not only visually but more so in the stories were told in the books and in the films and in the music. Often there was a certain amalgamation of elements, such as folk songs played in a psychedelic style, or a folk story illustrated in a very graphic manner.

Mehdi Ali Akbarzadeh is appointed as the General Director of Institute for the Intellectual Development of Children and Young Adults by order of the Minister of Education.

Post-Revolution

Although no longer at the center of an artistic vanguard, Kanoon continues to operate as an important public institution to this day; continuing with its program of libraries, publishing, animation, and most significantly, film.

In 1999, Children of Heaven was nominated for the Best Foreign Language Film of Academy Awards (Oscar) and honored in many festivals globally.

Partial filmography

Feature films

Short films

Animations

References

External links 

 
More about IIDCYA

Film production companies of Iran
Animation studios
Childhood in Iran
Producers who won the Best Film Crystal Simorgh